David Corke (born 13 February 1930) is an Australian documentary film maker, naturalist and educational author. 
He filmed first-encounter between Europeans and the aboriginal Pintupi people, and was the first person to film the birth of a red kangaroo.

Career 

Corke began making wildlife and natural history films in 1952, alongside colleagues Peter Bruce, Graham Pizzey and Gil Brealey. Films included Raak about Wedge-tailed eagles, Edge of The Deep about the pattern life along the tidelines; Baama> about bird life along the edge of the Murray River; and Sunset Country.

From 1959 to 1970 he worked for the Commonwealth Scientific and Industrial Research Organisation Film Unit., making a range of scientific films  that were widely distributed as 16mm film prints to community groups, clubs and schools.

In 1963, Corke was seconded to the University of Melbourne as director/cameraman for an expedition led by Dr. Donald Thomson into the Great Sandy Desert to study the Pintupi people living a traditional lifestyle in the area around Lake Mackay.  A documentary, People out of time, resulted from the expedition.

In the 1970s Corke made films and other AV resources for Educational Media Australia to support the "Web of Life" national biology program for schools – an initiative of John Stewart Turner and the Australian Academy of Science. 

Corke has also made several freelance natural history films (including the 
AFI Jedda award-winning film Late in a Wilderness,
Shed Tears for the River, and Eudyptula minor!) and written several series of books for school history and social studies programs. He has also written about the Burke and Wills expedition including books
and journal articles
 and was the founding president of the Burke and Wills historical society.

Filmography 

 Raak (1956) about Wedge-tailed eagles
 Edge of The Deep (1959) about the pattern life along the tidelines, winner of Australian Film Award
 Baama (1962) about bird life along the edge of the Murray River
 Sunset Country (1963)
 Bird banding in Australia (1964)
 The computer CSIRAC (1965)
 Window into space (1965) about the Parkes radio-telescope
 Birth of the red kangaroo (1965) about reproduction of the Red kangaroo
 A skeleton in the crop (1969) about the introduced invasive skeleton weed
 In Central Australia with Crosbie Morrison (1970)
 Flight Line One: Controlled Burning from Aircraft(1971)  about controlled burning for bushfire prevention
 Eudyptula minor! (1971) about Fairy Penguins.
 Late in a Wilderness (1972) about wildlife at a waterhole near Broken Hill, AFI Jedda award-winning film
 The Waterhole (1973) an edited, educational version of the film Late in a Wilderness;
 Shed Tears for the River (1973) about "the degradation and destruction of the natural environment of the Murray river system in South Australia by human activities"
 The Wetlands Problem (1979)
 Animals of Australia (1979)
 Desert Hopping Mouse (1982) about the spinifex hopping-mouse (Notomys alexis) of inland Australia;
 Egg-laying Mammals (1984) about Australian monotremes
 Yirritidja (1986) based on footage taken on the Bindibu expedition.

Memberships 
 Founding president (2005-8) of the Burke and Wills historical society.
 Accredited member of the  Australian Cinematographers Society.
 Member (and assistant secretary in 1948/1949) of the Royal Australasian Ornithologists Union (now BirdLife Australia).

References 

Australian documentary filmmakers
Australian cinematographers
Australian ornithologists
1930 births
Living people